Bahar Poshteh (also Romanized as Bahār Poshteh; also known as Barposhteh) is a village in Chehel Shahid Rural District, in the Central District of Ramsar County, Mazandaran Province, Iran. At the 2006 census, its population was 94, in 25 families.

References 

Populated places in Ramsar County